Gisela Dulko and Flavia Pennetta were the defending champions but decided not to participate.

Lourdes Domínguez Lino and María José Martínez Sánchez won the tournament beating Nuria Llagostera Vives and Arantxa Parra Santonja in an all Spanish final, 6–3, 6–3.

Seeds

Draw

Draw

External Links
 Main Draw

Swedish Open - Doubles
2011 Doubles
2011 in Swedish women's sport